Pablo Oshan Punyed Dubón (born 18 April 1990) is a professional soccer player who plays for Víkingur Reykjavík in the Úrvalsdeild. Born in the United States, he represents the El Salvador national team.

Early life
Punyed played high school soccer at Coral Park High in Miami where he played center midfield and served as a captain as a junior and senior. He later played college soccer at St. John's University.

Club career 
After graduating in 2012, Punyed started his professional career with Fjölnir in the Icelandic Úrvalsdeild karla. He spent the following season with Fylkir before signing with Stjarnan where he won the Icelandic championship in 2014. After two seasons with Stjarnan, he signed with ÍBV where he played two season. In 2018, he signed with Knattspyrnufélag Reykjavíkur. In 2019, he won the Icelandic championship with KR. In November 2020 Pablo signed for Víkingur Reykjavík.

International career
He made his international debut for the El Salvador national football team on October 10, 2014 against Colombia, where El Salvador was shut out 3–0. He then played three more games for El Salvador and received his first yellow card with the national side in the game against Nicaragua.

International goals
Scores and results El Salvador's goal tally first.

Honours

Club
Stjarnan
 Úrvalsdeild (1): 2014
 Icelandic Super Cup (1): 2015

ÍBV
Icelandic Cup (1): 2017

KR
 Úrvalsdeild (1): 2019

Víkingur
 Úrvalsdeild (1): 2021
 Icelandic Cup (2): 2021, 2022

Personal life
Punyed's younger brother Renato Punyed has capped for the Nicaragua national football team.

References

External links

1990 births
Living people
Salvadoran footballers
El Salvador international footballers
American soccer players
Association football midfielders
Salvadoran people of Nicaraguan descent
Salvadoran people of Spanish descent
American sportspeople of Salvadoran descent
Citizens of El Salvador through descent
American people of Nicaraguan descent
American people of Spanish descent
2015 CONCACAF Gold Cup players
2017 Copa Centroamericana players
Pablo Punyed
Pablo Punyed
Pablo Punyed
Pablo Punyed
Pablo Punyed
Pablo Punyed
Salvadoran expatriate footballers
Salvadoran expatriate sportspeople in Iceland
Expatriate footballers in Iceland
Soccer players from Miami
St. John's Red Storm men's soccer players
Sporting Kansas City draft picks
American expatriate soccer players
American expatriate sportspeople in Iceland